In college football, 2013 NCAA football bowl games may refer to:

2012–13 NCAA football bowl games, for games played in January 2013 as part of the 2012 season
2013–14 NCAA football bowl games, for games played in December 2013 as part of the 2013 season